FJG may refer to:
 Fatehjang railway station, in Pakistan
 Federal jobs guarantee 
 FJG RAM, a type of computer memory
 Fonda, Johnstown and Gloversville Railroad, a defunct American railway